Seongsan is a district in Changwon City, South Korea.

See also
 Changwon
 Uichang-gu
 Masan-Hoiwon-gu
 Masan-Happho-gu
 Jinhae-gu

References

External links 

Districts of Changwon